St. John of Rila Church ( / Tsarkva Sveti Ivan Rilski) is an Eastern Orthodox church building in Targovishte, Bulgaria. 

It is named after the Bulgarian Saint John of Rila (876 – c. 946) who was the first Bulgarian hermit.

The building is in the north of the town center, near the central market-place.

Architecture
The construction of the church started in 1912 but soon after that it was stopped because of the Balkan War. Finally it was completed in 1936. In 1961 unique wood-carved chancel-screen was made by professor Petar Kushlev. 

During the Seventies it was completely repaired and reconstructed with the donation from Andrey, Metropolitan of New York, who was the diocesan prelate of the Bulgarian Eastern Orthodox Diocese of the USA, Canada and Australia. He was buried in the church – narthex after his death in 1972.

References
 Varna Mitropilia

External links
 The official website of the Bulgarian Patriarchate
 The official website of the Bulgarian Orthodox Church

Bulgarian Orthodox churches in Bulgaria
Buildings and structures in Targovishte Province
Targovishte
Churches completed in 1936
20th-century Eastern Orthodox church buildings